USS Coronis (ARL-10) was one of 39  landing craft built for the United States Navy during World War II. Named for Coronis (one of several characters in Greek mythology, including the mother of Asclepius, god of medicine and healing), she was the only US Naval vessel to bear the name.

Renamed and reclassified USS Coronis (ARL-10) on 12 June 1944 she was placed in partial commission 29 June 1944 and sailed to Baltimore, Maryland for conversion to a landing craft repair ship. Coronis was commissioned in full 28 November 1944.

Service history
Departing Norfolk, Virginia 4 January 1945 Coronis arrived at Purvis Bay, in the Solomon Islands to repair battle-damaged landing craft in preparation for the invasion of Okinawa. Arriving at Ulithi, the staging area, on 24 March she joined the Service and Salvage Unit, and five days later sortied with them for Okinawa, arriving off the island 3 April. There she repaired landing craft and the smaller radar picket ships, and operated a fog generator to give protective cover from air attack to ships lying in her area. On 18 June Coronis sailed for Saipan and Guam to load spare parts and supplies, and continued to Subic Bay, in the Philippines, where she acted as repair ship for the training group preparing for the invasion of Japan.

After the end of the War, Coronis returned to Okinawa 26 August to repair landing ships of the 5th Fleet. She also converted  into a minecraft tender. She arrived in Wakayama Wan on 25 September to operate a boat pool, and service ships of the 5th Fleet carrying out occupation activities until 16 March 1946. After calling at Shanghai, China she sailed for Astoria, Oregon, arriving 2 May.

Coronis was placed out of commission in reserve at Vancouver, Washington on 29 July 1946. Struck from the Naval Vessel Register (date unknown), she was sold for commercial service in 1965 for CPR's British Columbia Coast Steamships and renamed MV Trailer Princess. In 1986 it was sold to Helifor Industries Ltd. of Vancouver, British Columbia, and as of 2017 it is used as an unpowered camp barge for heli-logging operations.

Coronis received one battle star for service during World War II.

References

 
 

 

Achelous-class repair ships
Ships built in Boston
1944 ships
World War II auxiliary ships of the United States
Achelous-class repair ships converted from LST-542-class ships